Larainae is a subfamily of riffle beetles in the family Elmidae. There are more than 20 genera and 160 described species in Larainae.

Genera
These 28 genera belong to the subfamily Larainae:

 Disersus Sharp, 1882
 Dryopomorphus Hamilton, 1936
 Hexanchorus Sharp, 1882
 Hispaniolara Brown, 1981
 Hydora Broun, 1882
 Hydrethus Fairmaire, 1889
 Hypsilara Maier & Spangler, 2011
 Jaechomorphus Kodada, 1993
 Laorina Jäch, 1997
 Lara LeConte, 1852
 Microlara Jäch, 1993
 Neblinagena Spangler, 1985
 Omotonus Delève, 1963
 Ovolara Brown, 1981
 Parapotamophilus Brown, 1981
 Phanoceroides Hinton, 1939
 Phanocerus Sharp, 1882
 Pharceonus Spangler & Santiago-Fragoso, 1992
 Potamocares Grouvelle, 1920
 Potamodytes Grouvelle, 1896
 Potamogethes Delève, 1963
 Potamolatres Delève, 1963
 Potamophilinus Grouvelle, 1896
 Potamophilops Grouvelle, 1896
 Potamophilus Germar, 1811
 Pseudodisersus Brown, 1981
 Roraima Kodada & Jäch, 1999
 Stetholus Carter & Zeck, 1929

References

Further reading

 
 
 
 
 
 

Elmidae